Anders Jacobsen may refer to:

 Anders Jacobsen (ski jumper) (born 1985), Norwegian ski jumper
 Anders Jacobsen (footballer) (born 1968), Norwegian football player and manager
 Anders K. Jacobsen (born 1989), Danish football player
 Anders Post Jacobsen (born 1985), Danish football player

See also
Anders Jacobsson (disambiguation)